Gardaneh-ye Chahar Murun-e Margown (also Romanized as Gardaneh-ye Chahār Mūrūn-e Mārgown; also known as Gardaneh-ye Chahār Mūrūn) is a village in Margown Rural District, Margown District, Boyer-Ahmad County, Kohgiluyeh and Boyer-Ahmad Province, Iran. At the 2006 census, its population was 35, in 5 families.

References 

Populated places in Boyer-Ahmad County